Chester is a village in Orange County, New York, United States. The population was 3,993 at the 2020 census. It was named after the City of Chester in the Cheshire region of northwest England. Chester is part of the Poughkeepsie–Newburgh–Middletown, NY Metropolitan Statistical Area as well as the larger New York–Newark–Bridgeport, NY-NJ-CT-PA Combined Statistical Area.

The Village of Chester is primarily located in the northern part of the Town of Chester.

History 
The village of Chester was incorporated in 1892. At the center of a dairy industry, the village claims to be the birthplace of Philadelphia Cream Cheese. Other brands produced in Chester were Clover Brand, Cow Brand, D’isigny, Fromage De Brie, Neufchatel, Star Brand and World Brand.

The village of Chester contains a historic section called Downtown Historic Chester. The Orange Heritage rail trail begins here at the site of the former Erie Railroad train station.

Geography

The village of Chester is located at  (41.357378, -74.275488). and has a total area of 2.1 square miles (5.5 km2), all land.

Highway access is provided by NY-94. Goose Pond Mountain State Park is southeast of the village.

Demographics

As of the census of 2000, there were 3,445 people, 1,396 households, and 901 families residing in the village. The population density was 1,628.0 people per square mile (627.4/km2). There were 1,455 housing units at an average density of 687.6 per square mile (265.0/km2). The racial makeup of the village was 83.45% White, 7.72% Black or African American, 0.93% Native American, 2.96% Asian, 2.61% from other races, and 2.32% from two or more races. Hispanic or Latino of any race were 10.16% of the population.

There were 1,396 households, out of which 30.7% had children under the age of 18 living with them, 50.8% were married couples living together, 10.5% had a female householder with no husband present, and 35.4% were non-families. 28.0% of all households were made up of individuals, and 8.2% had someone living alone who was 65 years of age or older. The average household size was 2.45 and the average family size was 3.04.

In the village, the population was spread out, with 23.5% under the age of 18, 7.3% from 18 to 24, 36.7% from 25 to 44, 21.6% from 45 to 64, and 10.9% who were 65 years of age or older. The median age was 36 years. For every 100 females, there were 92.4 males. For every 100 females age 18 and over, there were 89.0 males.

The median income for a household in the village was $55,417, and the median income for a family was $65,321. Males had a median income of $47,386 versus $31,957 for females. The per capita income for the village was $24,960. About 4.2% of families and 6.0% of the population were below the poverty line, including 7.7% of those under age 18 and 7.8% of those age 65 or over.

Notable people
William Terry Jackson, former US Congressman
Andy Grammer, singer/songwriter

References

External links

Village website
 Chester Historical Society Digital Collections
 Discovering the wheys and means of Chester’s cheese history
 The Chronicle, community newspaper

Villages in Orange County, New York
Villages in New York (state)
Poughkeepsie–Newburgh–Middletown metropolitan area
Chester, Orange County, New York